Ashley Nicolette Frangipane (born September 29, 1994), known professionally as Halsey, is an American singer and songwriter. She was born and raised in New Jersey. Gaining attention from self-released music on social media platforms, she was signed by Astralwerks in 2014 and released her debut EP, Room 93, later that year. She released her debut studio album, Badlands, in 2015. The album was later certified Double Platinum by the Recording Industry Association of America (RIAA), as were its tracks "Colors" and "Gasoline".

In 2016, she was featured on The Chainsmokers' single "Closer", which topped the charts in over 10 countries, and was later certified 14× Platinum by the RIAA. Her second studio album, Hopeless Fountain Kingdom (2017), consisted of more "radio-friendly" music than her previous releases; its singles "Now or Never" and "Bad at Love", both reached the top 20 of the Billboard Hot 100, with the latter peaking in the top five. In 2018, she released the single "Eastside" alongside Benny Blanco and Khalid, which reached the top ten on the Billboard Hot 100.

Halsey's third studio album, Manic (2020), became her best selling album worldwide, while its lead single "Without Me" became her most successful single as a lead artist. Her fourth studio album, If I Can't Have Love, I Want Power (2021), moved away from her previous sound in favor of a darker industrial sound; described by Halsey as "the album [she] always wanted to make", it was produced by Nine Inch Nails members Trent Reznor and Atticus Ross and received generally positive reviews.

In 2020, Billboard reported that Halsey has sold over 1 million albums and received over 6 billion streams in the United States. She is noted for her distinctive singing voice. Her awards include three Billboard Music Awards, as well as a Billboard Women in Music Award, an American Music Award, one GLAAD Media Award, an MTV Video Music Award, and nominations for three Grammy Awards. Halsey was named Songwriter of the Year by BMI Film & TV Awards in 2021. She was also included on Time annual list of the 100 most influential people in the world in 2020. Aside from music, she has been involved in suicide prevention awareness, sexual assault victim advocacy, and racial justice protests.

Early life 
Ashley Nicolette Frangipane was born in Edison, New Jersey, on September 29, 1994, the daughter of Nicole and Chris Frangipane. Her parents dropped out of college after her mother discovered that she was pregnant with her. Halsey's mother now works as an emergency medical technician (EMT), while her father manages a car dealership. Her mother is of Italian and Hungarian descent, whereas her father is mostly African American with some distant Irish ancestry. She has two younger brothers named Sevian and Dante. She played the violin, viola, and cello until moving on to the guitar when she was 14 years old. She grew up listening to Alanis Morissette, Justin Bieber, and Brand New. Throughout her childhood, her family moved frequently, as her parents worked many jobs. By the time she reached her teen years, she had enrolled in six schools.

Frangipane was bullied at school, and her suicide attempt at the age of 17 led to her being hospitalized for nearly three weeks. Following this, she was diagnosed with bipolar disorder, with which her mother was also diagnosed. She began using drugs soon after, saying her bipolar disorder caused her to become an "unconventional child". Also when she was 17, she became romantically involved with a man who was 24 and resided on Halsey Street in Brooklyn, from where she took her stage name. She said, "That's where I first start[ed] writing music and where I started to feel like I was a part of something bigger than my town in middle of nowhere New Jersey. Halsey is kind of like a manifestation of all the exaggerated parts of me, so it's like an alter ego." In 2012, she graduated from Warren Hills Regional High School in Washington, New Jersey.

After graduating, Frangipane enrolled in the Rhode Island School of Design, but she withdrew due to financial hardship and instead attended community college. She eventually dropped out of community college and was kicked out by her parents, who she said "just didn't agree with a lot of things about [her]". Soon after, she lived in a basement in Lower Manhattan with a group of "degenerate stoners" she knew through her then-boyfriend. When she was not living there, she occasionally lived in one of New York's many homeless shelters, and she considered prostitution as a way to make money. When describing this period of her life, she has said, "I remember one time I had $9 in my bank account, and bought a four-pack of Red Bull and used it to stay up overnight over the course of two or three days, because it was less dangerous to not sleep than it was to sleep somewhere random and maybe get raped or kidnapped." She would occasionally stay with her maternal grandmother during this time.

Career

2012–2014: Career beginnings
Frangipane started writing music when she was 17, and in 2012, she began posting videos to social media sites such as YouTube and Kik, and in particular Tumblr, under the username se7enteenblack. She became known for a parody of Taylor Swift's song "I Knew You Were Trouble", inspired by Swift's relationship with Harry Styles. She then wrote a follow-up song about their relationship, which was posted online in early 2013. In early 2014, Frangipane went to a party and met a "music guy" who asked her to collaborate on a song with him because he liked her voice. The result, a song about her ex-boyfriend, titled "Ghost", was posted by Frangipane on SoundCloud several weeks after it was recorded. Within hours, the song gained online popularity and she was subsequently contacted by several record labels, with the song eventually charting and going on radio. She signed with Astralwerks, feeling that they gave her more creative freedom than other labels that contacted her.

Following this, Frangipane played numerous acoustic shows in different cities under several stage names. She chose Halsey as her permanent stage name because it is an anagram of her first name and is also a reference to the Halsey Street station of the New York City Subway in Brooklyn, a place where she spent a lot of time as a teenager. She also stated Halsey was the most popular name she used. Having written poems for years, Halsey began writing more serious songs as a way to promote them. Music became her "confessional approach" and a form of therapy after the difficult life she had endured.

2014–2016: Badlands and breakthrough

Halsey began touring with The Kooks in August 2014 and performed various original songs. She released her debut extended play, Room 93, on October 27, 2014. The EP charted in the lower regions of the US Billboard 200 and at number three on the Top Heatseekers chart. She then began work on her debut studio album and performed songs from it at South by Southwest in 2015, where she was the most tweeted-about performer of the night. She embarked on a co-headlining tour with Young Rising Sons in March, and in June, she became the opening act for Imagine Dragons during the North American leg of their Smoke + Mirrors Tour (2015).

Halsey's debut studio album, Badlands, was released on August 28, 2015. She described Badlands as a concept album about a dystopian future society known as "The Badlands", which was a metaphor for her mental state at the time, stating that each song meant something different to her. Halsey wrote all of the songs on the album when she was 19, while production was handled by a number of producers, including then-boyfriend, Norwegian producer Lido. The album was described by Halsey as not having a "proper radio hit". It received positive reviews from music critics, with Joe Levy of Rolling Stone citing Halsey as a "new Tumblr popstar with a knack for sticky imagery". Badlands debuted at #2 on the Billboard 200 albums chart in the US, selling 115,000 copies in its first week, of which 97,000 were pure album sales. The album found success in several other countries, including Australia, Canada, and New Zealand, where the album debuted in the top three. It was further promoted by Halsey's Badlands Tour (2015–16), and her spot as the opening act for select dates of The Weeknd's The Madness Fall Tour (2015).

Badlands was certified two-times Platinum by the Recording Industry Association of America (RIAA) for U.S. sales of 2,000,000 units. Four singles were released from the album: "Ghost", "New Americana", "Colors", and "Castle", all of which were certified Platinum in the US. The latter three singles achieved minor commercial success: "New Americana" reached number 60 on the US Billboard Hot 100, "Castle" was rerecorded for the soundtrack of the 2016 film The Huntsman: Winter's War. "Gasoline" was not released as a single and was only included on the deluxe version of Badlands, but became one of the album's most popular tracks and was certified Platinum in the US.

Halsey was featured on the song "The Feeling" by Justin Bieber for his fourth studio album, Purpose (2015). The song was not officially released as a single, though it entered the top forty of the Billboard Hot 100 and was certified Gold in the US and Silver in the United Kingdom. In February 2016, Halsey was one of four female performers to partner with MAC cosmetics for their Future Forward line; she released a lipstick named after herself. The senior vice president and group creative director of the company, James Gager, said, "It feels like a great thing to be able to support artists who are breaking through but aren't necessarily at the top top, to push them forward." In May 2016, Halsey released the song "Tokyo Narita (Freestyle)", produced by Lido. The song was a standalone track that served as a promotional single for both her and Lido. In July 2016, she collaborated with 26 other artists for the charity single "Hands", which was a tribute for the victims of the Pulse nightclub shooting.

On July 29, 2016, Halsey was featured as a vocalist on the Chainsmokers' single "Closer", a song she also cowrote. The track achieved major commercial success: it topped the Billboard Hot 100 for 12 consecutive weeks, topped the charts of 12 other countries, sold more than 15 million units worldwide, and is one of the most streamed songs on Spotify. The official lyric video for "Closer" was released on YouTube on July 29, 2016, and has since garnered over two billion views. Billboard magazine noted Halsey's solo verse as a favorable part of the song, and the song earned her a Grammy Award nomination for Best Pop Duo/Group Performance.

2017–2018: Hopeless Fountain Kingdom
Halsey announced work on her second studio album prior to the release of Badlands, with progress on the record continuing throughout 2016 and 2017. In January 2017, she released the single "Not Afraid Anymore"; it appears on the soundtrack of the film Fifty Shades Darker (2017). "Now or Never" was released on April 4 as the lead single from her second studio album. The song debuted at number 52 on the US Billboard Hot 100 and later peaked at number 17. It was certified 2× Platinum by the RIAA. "Now or Never" also reached the top 20 of Australia and Malaysia, and sold 500,000 units outside of the US. Two promotional singles were also made available prior to the release of the album: "Eyes Closed" and "Strangers"'.

The record, Hopeless Fountain Kingdom, finally came out on June 2. It consisted of more "radio friendly" songs in comparison to her previous work, which she attributed to her desire to prove she was "more than capable" of creating "radio-ready" music. Much like her debut, Hopeless Fountain Kingdom is a concept album that revolves around a pair of lovers in a tale based on Romeo and Juliet; the project was inspired by her breakup with Lido. The album also focuses on Halsey's bisexuality and on bisexual characters. Hopeless Fountain Kingdom debuted atop the Billboard 200 and the Canadian Albums Chart. First-week sales in the US were of 106,000 units, with 76,000 being pure album sales. Similar to her debut, Hopeless Fountain Kingdom was certified Platinum by the RIAA. Due to its rise to number one, Halsey became the first woman to achieve a number one album in the US in 2017. To promote the record, Halsey embarked on the Hopeless Fountain Kingdom World Tour, which began on September 29, 2017, her twenty-third birthday. The artist also performed surprise DJ sets at Emo Nite in Los Angeles in 2017.
The second single from Hopeless Fountain Kingdom, "Bad at Love", was released on August 22. The song peaked at number five in the US, which made it her highest peak as a lead artist at the time. It was certified 4× Platinum by the RIAA, and sold more than 300,000 records outside the US. In December, Halsey's collaboration with then-boyfriend G-Eazy, "Him & I", was released, and later peaked at number 14 on the Billboard Hot 100 and achieved a 2× Platinum certification by the RIAA in the US. The song also reached the top ten of 13 other countries' charts. Halsey also collaborated with the band Thirty Seconds to Mars on the song "Love Is Madness", from their 2018 album America.

On January 13, 2018, Halsey was featured as a musical guest on the American television variety show Saturday Night Live, where she performed "Bad at Love" and "Him & I", with G-Eazy. On March 15, she released "Alone", together with a new version featuring American rapper Big Sean and British rapper Stefflon Don. It was released as the third and final single from Hopeless Fountain Kingdom, and a music video came out in April. "Alone" was certified Platinum by the RIAA and reached number one on Billboard's Dance Club chart, though it only peaked at number 66 on the Billboard Hot 100. Halsey sang with Khalid on Benny Blanco's debut single "Eastside", which was released on July 12, along with a music video discussing various parts of Halsey's life. The song peaked at number nine on the Billboard Hot 100 and topped the charts of five other countries. It was certified 2× Platinum in the US, and sold over one million units outside the country. Also in the same year, she appeared in two films: she voiced Wonder Woman in Teen Titans Go! To the Movies, and cameoed as herself in A Star Is Born, directed by Bradley Cooper. Halsey was also a key advisor on the US version of The Voice in its fifteenth season.

2018–2021: Manic and If I Can't Have Love, I Want Power
On October 4, 2018, Halsey released a single titled "Without Me", her first through Capitol Records.  She stated that the song was very personal to her. On October 29, the official music video for "Without Me" was released, featuring a "G-Eazy lookalike", following their second breakup. This song went on to become Halsey's most successful single as a lead artist to date, becoming her first solo number-one single on the Billboard Hot 100. It topped the chart for two non-consecutive weeks and remained in the top five for 22 weeks. It also reached the top three of the UK, Malaysia, Australia, Canada, New Zealand, and Ireland. The song has been certified 9× Platinum in the US, 2× Platinum in the UK, 8× Platinum in Australia, and 9× Platinum in Canada. Due to "Without Me" reaching number one on the Billboard Hot 100, Halsey became the eighth woman to achieve multiple number ones on the chart during the 2010s.

The singer made several releases and collaborated with various artists during the first several months of 2019, including a remix of "Without Me", featuring American rapper Juice WRLD on January 9, the song "11 Minutes" with Yungblud (featuring Travis Barker) on February 14, with the accompanying music video released on February 22, and the song "Boy with Luv" with Korean boy band BTS on April 12, the music video for which became the most–viewed music video within its first 24 hours on YouTube, with 74.6 million views. On April 19, she and 29 other musical acts were featured on the Lil Dicky song "Earth", a charity single about climate change awareness.

On February 9, Halsey again appeared on Saturday Night Live, this time as both host and musical guest. Her performance was praised, with ratings for the show rising and a younger audience watching. In March, she announced that her third studio album would be released in 2019. The album is titled Manic, and was eventually released on January 17, 2020. On May 17, 2019, Halsey issued the single "Nightmare", which debuted and peaked at number fifteen on the US Hot 100. On September 13, 2019, she released the single "Graveyard". On September 23, 2019, Halsey announced the Manic World Tour, in support of her third studio album. The first leg of the tour took place in Europe between February and March 2020. She released a promotional single, "Clementine", on her birthday, September 29, 2019.  On January 25, 2020, she again appeared on Saturday Night Live, where she performed two songs from Manic: "You Should Be Sad" and "Finally // Beautiful Stranger". She also appeared in a few sketches.

In December 2019, Halsey appeared on the Bring Me the Horizon EP Music to Listen To…. The band's vocalist, Oli Sykes, later teased additional collaborations; one of them was revealed a month later to be the Oli Sykes and Jordan Fish-produced song "Experiment on Me", from the soundtrack of the superhero film Birds of Prey (2020), which was released on February 7, 2020. A collaboration with Marshmello titled "Be Kind" was released on May 1, with the music video premiering on June 27. On June 25, 2020, Halsey announced that her first book of poetry, entitled I Would Leave Me If I Could, was available for preorder. The same year, she also released her first live album, Badlands (Live from Webster Hall), on August 28.

On August 27, 2021, Halsey released her fourth studio album, If I Can't Have Love, I Want Power, with little prior promotion. Produced by Nine Inch Nails members Trent Reznor and Atticus Ross, it received critical acclaim. Leading up to the album's release, a companion film of the same name was screened at select IMAX theaters; it was later released on HBO Max on October 7. The album was further supported by the single "I Am Not a Woman, I'm a God".

2022–present: "So Good" release controversy 
In January 2022, Halsey wrote and produced a song, titled "So Good". When the song's release was withheld from release due to Capitol needing to test the song's "virality", Halsey posted a TikTok video criticizing Capitol Records on May 22, 2022 for not being allowed to release "So Good" without an "accompanying campaign or TikTok video to make it go viral." Five days prior, without the approval of Capitol, Halsey played a snippet of her song in a TikTok video. In the days following her post, questions arose regarding whether or not Capitol was going to take legal action against her. Music industry attorney Erin M. Jacobson mentioned in an article by TIME that "it is rare that a label would sue one of its own artists, especially when the label plans to continue working with that artist. Further, using such a short piece of the record could also be seen as a promotional use." Capitol Records eventually conceded on May 31, 2022, amid criticism and scrutiny from a variety of music artists, and set a release date for the song of June 9, 2022. There have been questions to whether the release controversy was a marketing stunt from observers, though Halsey maintained throughout the controversy that it was not fake. Many news outlets commented on the increasing nature, and problem, of pressures for TikTok virality on musicians by record labels.

Artistry

Influences
During Halsey's childhood, her mother listened to the Cure, Alanis Morissette, and Nirvana, while her father listened to the Notorious B.I.G., Slick Rick, Bone Thugs-n-Harmony, and Tupac Shakur. She has said that their musical tastes have been a great influence on her. She has called Panic! at the Disco the "band that changed [her] fucking life" and credits Lady Gaga for giving her the strength to be herself. She has also mentioned a Long Island rock band, Brand New, as both an influence and a favorite of hers, once changing her biography on Instagram to "The Devil and God Are Raging Inside Me", a reference to their third album. Halsey has cited Taylor Swift as a huge reason why she always insists on writing her own music. Her other influences include Mick Jagger, David Bowie, Bob Dylan, Jimi Hendrix, Christina Aguilera, Marilyn Manson, Beck, Kanye West, Amy Winehouse, the Weeknd, Alex Turner, Bright Eyes, and the Wonder Years.

Halsey credits Dolores O'Riordan as her major vocal influence, saying "Dolores O'Riordan was a massive influence for me. I grew up listening to the Cranberries with my mother and learned so much about having an unconventional singing voice. Dolores taught me how to use my voice in a manner that was emotive, even if I wasn't classically skilled... Her voice was beautiful to me. And she was a fierce badass trailblazing woman in the rock landscape... Always an inspiration to me...".

The artist has said "There's plenty of musicians that I love and respect, but I think that I'm the most inspired by cinema." Filmmakers who have influenced her include Quentin Tarantino, Harmony Korine, and Larry Clark.

Music style and themes

Halsey is noted for her distinctive "indie" style of singing, which has garnered controversial feedback. She sings with an accent different from her speaking voice. She is known as a pop, electropop, synth-pop, art pop, alternative pop, R&B, indie pop, and alternative R&B artist.
The New York Times Jon Caramanica noted, "Halsey arrived as part of a slew of female pop rebels who emerged in the wake of Lorde's early-2010s recalibration of the genre's operating hierarchies." When speaking of Badlands, Billboard stated, "Halsey's larger-than-life vision combines the synthy darkness of Lorde, the neon-pop chutzpah of Miley Cyrus and the flickering film noir of Lana Del Rey."

Halsey's music focuses on her personal experiences and telling a story. She writes about relationships with other women in her music as a way of solidifying her bisexuality.

Videos and stage
The biggest influence on her live performances is Adam Lazzara, the frontman of Taking Back Sunday, as she said, "One of the most inspiring things I've ever seen is watching [Taking Back Sunday] live and watching Adam use that microphone as a prop and I thought yep, I'm gonna do that."

Public image

In her early career, Halsey drew criticism for allegedly calling herself "tri-bi" in an interview, due to her being biracial, bipolar, and bisexual. In a 2016 interview with Rolling Stone, she criticized the label as a trivializing way to describe her. Halsey became most known for her signature dyed blue hair in her early career. She sparked controversy in 2016 after several fan interactions, some involving the artist kissing underage fans.

In June 2017, Halsey received backlash for collaborating with Quavo, an artist who has made homophobic remarks. She stated she has never spoken to Quavo, and continued to say that she would not put "a lot of people" in her songs. She criticized Iggy Azalea for her "complete disregard for black culture". She also criticized Demi Lovato for, in Halsey's view, treating bisexuality as taboo in the song "Cool for the Summer".

Halsey has described herself as an "in-between role model" and an "inconvenient woman", due to her music and style. She stated in 2017 that although she passes as white, she is a black woman and proud of her heritage. She was included on Forbes 30 Under 30 list, and appeared on the cover of magazines such as Billboard, Paper, and Playboy. She has appeared in advertisements for Jeep, Beats Electronics, and ModCloth. At other times, she has been described as a feminist icon. She has also been called the "voice of her generation". Her relationship with G-Eazy gathered significant media attention due to rumors of drug use, arrest, cheating, and G-Eazy's feuds with other artists.

While much of her music is labeled as pop, Halsey has long identified as an alternative artist, stating she can do pop collaborations without being considered a pop artist, similar to Kendrick Lamar. She states she is only classified as pop because she is a woman. In 2019, she called herself "the anti-popstar" and stated she does not care how people identify her music, as long as it connects with them.

Activism
During the 2016 presidential election, Halsey was an avid supporter of Bernie Sanders and urged fans to vote for him. In July 2016, she and 26 other artists were featured on the charity single "Hands", which was a tribute to the victims of the Pulse nightclub shooting. During the 2020 Democratic presidential primaries, Halsey further endorsed Sanders on March 11, 2020, urging fans to vote for him via social media and a promotional video collaborating with the Sanders campaign.

As a result of her own attempted suicide at age 17, Halsey took part in the mental health and suicide prevention awareness campaign called "I'm Listening", which was hosted by radio network Entercom and broadcast live on September 10, 2017.

Halsey identifies as a feminist. Following the 2017 Women's March, she sent out a tweet that promised to donate one dollar to Planned Parenthood for every retweet it received. She ended up donating $100,000 to the organization. Halsey delivered a speech to more than 200,000 protesters at the 2018 Women's March. Instead of a traditional speech, she performed a five-minute poem titled "A Story Like Mine", in which she told personal stories of sexual assault and violence throughout her life. Her personal narrative included accompanying her best friend to Planned Parenthood after she had been raped, her personal account of sexual assault by neighbors and boyfriends, and women sexually assaulted by Olympic doctor Larry Nassar. She completed her speech by requesting all—"Black, Asian, poor, wealthy, trans, cis, Muslim, Christian"—sexual assault victims to listen and support each other. AJ Willingham of CNN opined in a headline that "Halsey's Women's March speech moved people around the world." In March 2018, Halsey protested alongside numerous other celebrities at March for Our Lives in Washington, D.C. In May 2018, she criticized Ivanka Trump over Twitter, complaining that she was too relaxed while her father, then-president Donald Trump, hurt immigrant children.

In November 2018, Halsey performed at the Victoria's Secret Fashion Show alongside numerous other artists, but in December she criticised the company for its lack of inclusion of transgender models in its various shows, stating, "as a member of the LGBT+ community, I have no tolerance for a lack of inclusivity. Especially not motivated by stereotype." Later that month, she performed her hit song "Without Me" on The Voice and was criticized for "sensually" dancing with backup dancer Jade Chynoweth. Many perceived the backlash as homophobic, including Halsey herself who defended the performance. In a January 2019 interview with Glamour, she advocated for a stronger presence of women in music. In April 2019, she and 29 other musical acts were featured on the charity single "Earth", which raises climate change awareness. In May 2020, Halsey, alongside Yungblud, joined protests in Los Angeles for racial justice in the wake of the murder of George Floyd.

In June 2020, she launched The Black Creators Fund, founded to provide financial support, resources, and a platform to black creators.

Personal life

Relationships
Halsey is openly bisexual. Prior to her music career, she dated a woman. In March 2021, she announced that she uses both "she/her" and "they/them" pronouns.

From 2015 to 2016, she dated Norwegian producer Lido, who helped produce Badlands and inspired Hopeless Fountain Kingdom. In 2017, Halsey began dating rapper G-Eazy. They had met at a party that year and although they pursued different music, they found common ground for their collaboration "Him & I", which discussed their love and lifestyle. The pair broke up in July 2018, though their relationship was on-and-off-again until ending that September. She later confirmed that her 2018 song "Without Me" is partially about this relationship. Between November 2018 and September 2019, Halsey was in a relationship with English musician Yungblud. She then dated actor Evan Peters from October 2019 to March 2020.

In January 2021, Halsey announced that she was expecting her first child with her partner, Turkish-American screenwriter Alev Aydin. Their son was born in July 2021.

Health
Since the beginning of her career, Halsey has been open about her personal health. Discussing her career in 2015, she stated, "I'm just this fucked-up stoner kid who made it."

Halsey has bipolar disorder. She was diagnosed with the mental disorder at age 17, and said that her mother also has it. At that age, she attempted suicide, which is what led to her diagnosis and a 17-day admission to a psychiatric hospital. Not long after her suicide attempt, she began having success in the music industry. She said that singing and performing helped her manage the symptoms she experiences. Despite the struggles she has faced as a result of this mood disorder, she has stated that she embraces being bipolar, because it makes her "really empathetic". On December 11, 2021, Halsey informed fans via Twitter that she was diagnosed with ADHD in high school, and that
she assumed she just grew out of it. However, she is now medicated for it, as a result of seeking mental health treatment during the COVID-19 pandemic.

Halsey was diagnosed with endometriosis in 2016, and went public with it on Twitter. She attributes a miscarriage she suffered in 2015 to her endometriosis, originally stating in 2016 that it was due to her hectic touring schedule. Only hours after she realized she was having a miscarriage, she went on stage to perform during a tour, because she did not want to hurt her career by missing a performance. She chronicled her struggles with endometriosis on the talk show The Doctors in April 2018, where she revealed she was going to freeze her eggs.

Also in 2018, Halsey spoke openly about her endometriosis and the pain it causes at the Blossom Ball, which is run by the Endometriosis Foundation of America. She said at the event, "Sometimes I'm bloated, I'm on an IV, I'm sick, I'm on medicine, and I'm backstage, terrified that I'm going to bleed through my clothes in the middle of my show." She told the event's attendees that she wanted to speak out about her condition, because the media often portrays her as having perfect physical health despite her health struggles. In January 2017, she underwent surgery in an attempt to lessen the pain caused by the condition. She has not disclosed what type of surgery she underwent.

Halsey is gluten intolerant. On August 14, 2019, she revealed on Twitter that she had quit smoking cigarettes after a decade.

Halsey has been diagnosed with Ehlers–Danlos syndrome, Sjögren syndrome, mast cell activation syndrome, and POTS (postural orthostatic tachycardia syndrome).

Discography 

 Badlands (2015)
 Hopeless Fountain Kingdom (2017)
 Manic (2020)
 If I Can't Have Love, I Want Power (2021)

Filmography

Music videos

Film

Television

Web

Tours 
Headlining
 Badlands Tour (2015–2016)
 Hopeless Fountain Kingdom World Tour (2017–2018)
 Manic World Tour (2020)
 Love and Power Tour (2022)

Co-headlining
 The American Youth Tour (2015) (with Young Rising Sons)

Opening act
 Imagine Dragons Smoke + Mirrors Tour (2015)
 The Weeknd The Madness Fall Tour (2015)

Awards and nominations

See also

 LGBTQ culture in New York City
 List of people with bipolar disorder
 List of artists who reached number one in the United States
 List of artists who reached number one on the U.S. dance chart
 List of artists who reached number one on the Billboard Mainstream Top 40 chart

Notes

References

External links 

 

 
1994 births
Activists from New Jersey
African-American feminists
African-American record producers
American women pop singers
American people of Hungarian descent
American people of Italian descent
American people of Irish descent
American film actresses
American television actresses
American voice actresses
Astralwerks artists
Bisexual singers
Bisexual women
Bisexual feminists
Bisexual actresses
Bisexual songwriters
Feminist musicians
LGBT African Americans
LGBT people from New Jersey
American LGBT singers
American LGBT songwriters
Living people
People from Clark, New Jersey
Musicians from Edison, New Jersey
People from Washington, New Jersey
People with bipolar disorder
Singer-songwriters from New Jersey
MTV Europe Music Award winners
21st-century African-American women singers
20th-century American LGBT people
21st-century American LGBT people
American bisexual actors
People with Ehlers–Danlos syndrome
African-American women singer-songwriters
Women who experienced pregnancy loss
American bisexual writers
People with Endometriosis